Alured (died 1160) was a bishop of Worcester.

Alured may also refer to:

Given name
Alured Arnold Callin (1924–2015), Manx politician
Alured Clarke (1744–1832), British Army officer
Alured Clarke (priest) (1696–1742), Dean of Exeter 1741–1742
Alured Dumbell (1835–1900), Manx judge and Clerk of the Rolls
Alured Ransom (1908-1992), American sports coach

Surname
John Alured (1607–1651), English MP and army officer
Thomas Alured (1583–1638), English landowner and politician
Thomas Alured (died 1562), or Thomas Aldred (by 1515–1562), English politician

See also
Alfred (disambiguation)
Allure (disambiguation)
Allured (disambiguation)